Fantasma is a 2013 album by Italian indie rock band Baustelle, and topped the charts of that same year in Italy.

Certifications

References

2013 albums